The 2021 ESET V4 Cup is the ninth season of the ESET V4 Cup. The season began on 15 April at the Hungaroring and will end on 5 September at Automotodrom Brno. The season consists of the TCR, GT, Endurance, Clio Cup, Twingo Cup, and D2 championships.

Calendar
The calendar for all championships was announced on 17 March 2021.

TCR Eastern Europe Trophy

GT

Teams and drivers

Results 

Bold indicates overall winner.

Endurance

Teams and drivers

Results
Bold indicates overall winner.

Clio Cup

Teams and drivers

Results 

Bold indicates overall winner.

Twingo Cup

Teams and drivers

Results

D2 Formula

Teams and drivers

Results
Bold indicates overall winner.

References

External links

ESET V4 Cup
ESET V4 Cup